Upward may refer to:

Music
 Upwards (album), a 2003 album British hip-hop artist Ty

Organizations
 Upward Bound, a federally funded educational program within the United States
 Upward Bound High School, a school in Hartwick, New York
 Upwardly Global, an American non-profit organization

People
 Allen Upward (1863–1926), British poet, lawyer, politician and teacher
 Christopher Upward (1938–2002), British orthographer, son of Edward Upward
 Edward Upward (1903–2009), British novelist and short-story writer, cousin of Allen Upward

Science
 Upward (military project), the code name for assistance given to NASA during Project Apollo
 upward continuation, a method used in oil exploration and geophysics
 upward looking sonar, a sonar device
 upward spiral, a term to describe the continually rising cost of military equipment relative to civilian manufactured goods

See also
 
 
 up (disambiguation)